is a Japanese race walker. He competed in the 50 kilometres walk event at the 2012 Summer Olympics, but failed to finish.

International competitions

References

1983 births
Living people
Sportspeople from Toyama Prefecture
Japanese male racewalkers
Olympic male racewalkers
Olympic athletes of Japan
Athletes (track and field) at the 2004 Summer Olympics
Athletes (track and field) at the 2008 Summer Olympics
Athletes (track and field) at the 2012 Summer Olympics
Athletes (track and field) at the 2016 Summer Olympics
Asian Games gold medalists for Japan
Asian Games gold medalists in athletics (track and field)
Athletes (track and field) at the 2014 Asian Games
Medalists at the 2014 Asian Games
World Athletics Championships athletes for Japan
World Athletics Championships medalists
Japan Championships in Athletics winners
20th-century Japanese people
21st-century Japanese people